The Cavalier Daily is an independent, student-run daily news organization at the University of Virginia. Founded in 1890, under the name College Topics, The Cavalier Daily is Virginia's oldest collegiate daily and the oldest daily newspaper in Charlottesville, Virginia.

Since the summer of 1996, The Cavalier Daily has been the only daily newspaper at the University, with a print circulation of 7,500 distributed on Grounds and in the surrounding Charlottesville area. The Cavalier Daily also publishes content online and on social media daily with expanded and enhanced content.

The Cavalier Daily staffers have gone on to write professionally and edit for some of journalism's most prestigious publications and news outlets, including The New York Times, The Washington Post, CNN and CBS News, among other nationally prominent newspapers, magazines and broadcast networks.

History

Founding and name 
The Cavalier Daily printed its first issue under the name College Topics on January 15, 1890. In 1924, the newspaper increased its publication schedule from twice a week to six times a week, making the paper a daily.  However, the following year, the paper's off-campus printer suffered a catastrophic fire, and the newspaper alternated between two and three publication days a week until 1940.

During World War II College Topics struggled for survival as the University of Virginia student population was greatly reduced due to the war effort.  By 1943, the paper had become a four-page weekly that featured only bulletins.  After the war, the paper increased its circulation and content, and was renamed The Cavalier Daily on May 4, 1948.

The admission of women and African-American students to the University of Virginia beginning in the early 1970s changed the face of the paper as well as the university community.  The increased diversity of the community challenged what is often characterized as the preexisting "good old boy" attitude at both the school and The Cavalier Daily, resulting in a staff that became more motivated and ambitious.  The first woman member of the Managing Board, Mary Love, was elected business manager in 1973, and the first woman editor-in-chief, Marjorie Leedy, followed in 1976.  During this time, Managing Board races became highly competitive, and the paper adopted more professional journalistic standards.  In 1973, a staff split resulted in several unsuccessful candidates for the Managing Board leaving to form The Declaration, a weekly tabloid-format publication that continues to publish. In 1976, The Cavalier Daily became the first college publication to receive a Robert F. Kennedy Journalism Award.

Media Board crisis

The University's Media Board, a body composed of students and supervised by the University's Board of Visitors, was founded in 1976 to regulate on-Grounds media, but The Cavalier Daily ignored it as a matter of practice.  In April 1979, the confrontation came to a head when University President Frank Hereford presented the paper with the ultimatum of accepting the Media Board and the Board of Visitors' authority or being forced to leave its offices. The newspaper refused to acknowledge administrative supervision, and The Cavalier Daily was evicted from its offices on April 4, 1979, continuing to publish from rented space in the offices of Charlottesville's Daily Progress.

On April 5, a student protest of the eviction, including a 1,500-student demonstration in front of Hereford's office on the Lawn and condemnation from Student Council, encouraged both sides to end the impasse, and the newspaper agreed to a compromise on April 6.  The Cavalier Dailys movement toward complete independence emerged from the Media Board crisis.

The fallout of the Media Board crisis led to the 1983 formation of the Cavalier Daily Alumni Association, with the stated purpose to support the newspaper and aid it in times of need.

Competition 
In 1979, the University saw the creation of another student-run newspaper, the University Journal, which originally formed in opposition to what many saw as the left-wing editorial stances of The Cavalier Daily.  An intense rivalry between the two newspapers for news and advertising grew as the University Journal published three times weekly in the 1980s and then four times weekly beginning in 1991.  Amid significant debt, the University Journal cut back production starting in 1996 and ceased to exist by 1998.  Since that time, The Cavalier Daily has been one of two physical newspapers at the University of Virginia, alongside The Declaration, a bi-weekly tabloid-format newsmagazine.

Web edition 
In 1995, The Cavalier Daily Online Edition was launched, and in 1998, The Cavalier Daily began to pay rent for its offices in Newcomb Hall, the last step in the path toward complete independence from the University that began in earlier decades. The Digitization Project, completed in 2001, made all aspects of production computer-based. In May 2020, The Cavalier Daily launched a redesigned website.

University governance crisis 
In the media firestorm surrounding the forced resignation of Teresa Sullivan, the University of Virginia president, The Cavalier Daily obtained a series of emails using the Freedom of Information Act that shone a light on the actions of the University's Board of Visitors.

Cartoon controversy 
In September 2007, The Cavalier Daily received backlash for publishing a cartoon that depicted nine Black men in loincloths throwing ordinary items such as a shoe and a chair at each other, with the caption: "Ethiopian Food Fight." The newspaper later retracted the cartoon and fired the cartoonist. The editor in chief at the time told The Washington Post that he knew the cartoon was offensive, but approved it anyways because "we print a lot of offensive things." The previous week, the same cartoonist made a strip that depicted Thomas Jefferson with a whip, standing before a Black woman sitting on the bed, who says, "Thomas, could we try role-playing for a change?" The string of cartoons frayed The Cavalier Dailys relationship with the Black community on Grounds, and a Facebook group titled "THE CAV DAILY IS ABOUT TO BE FINISHED" soon emerged. The page claimed "the Cav Daily has crossed the boundary, but this time will not go unnoticed. We need to organize and end this racism once and for all."

Operations and Governance

The Cavalier Daily, until January 2012, went to press five issues per week in the fall and spring semesters. Starting in January 2012, the newspaper cut its Friday edition. Starting in August 2013, The Cavalier Daily replaced its daily newspaper with a revamped biweekly newsmagazine and expanded online and mobile content offerings. New digital offerings included mobile and tablet apps, a daily e-newsletter, high-quality multimedia content and an increased emphasis on social media and web graphics. In 2017, The Cavalier Daily launched abCD magazine as a way to share longer-form stories through words and creative visuals. In 2019, The Cavalier Daily created On Record, a weekly podcast available on Spotify and Apple Podcasts. In 2020, as the COVID-19 pandemic forced students off Grounds for the first time in University history, The Cavalier Daily launched a redesigned website with easier access to articles and video content. The new website helped transition The Cavalier Daily into a digital-first news organization, with print editions coming out once every other week instead of weekly. In 2021, The Cavalier Daily began posting week-in-review videos on its Instagram page as part of its effort to increase social media engagement.  

Print distribution is 7,500 copies across the University Grounds and Charlottesville. Starting in August 2015, The Cavalier Daily began printing at Narrow Passage Press in Edinburg, Virginia. Previously, the newspaper was printed at the press of the Culpeper Star-Exponent in Culpeper, Virginia.

In an average year, the newspaper's staff exceeds 400 students, who are all volunteers. The paper's editors include five members of the Managing Board, several copy editors, online managers and editors, and over two dozen section editors, all elected by the staff each January.

The student journalists are solely responsible for all content under the direction of the student editor-in-chief. Ava MacBlane was elected the 134th editor-in-chief of The Cavalier Daily on December 19, 2022.

Accolades and Awards 

The Cavalier Daily has been recognized as one of the best college newspapers in the country. In 2020, it was named the third best public college newspaper by The Princeton Review.

In recent years, The Cavalier Daily has won dozens of Virginia Press Association awards for its news, opinion, feature and critical content, as well as design, in a competition that places the paper in competition with professional daily newspapers across the state.

Notable people

Media/journalism

 Nancy Andrews (Managing Editor, 1985): photojournalist and author, 1999 White House Photographer of the Year

Nancy Barnes (Editor-in-Chief, 1981): senior vice president for news and editorial director, National Public Radio; former executive editor, The Houston Chronicle 
Kate Bedingfield (Sports Writer, 2000–02): White House Communications Director in the Biden administration
Jamelle Bouie (Arts Writer, 2006): opinion columnist, The New York Times; political analyst, CBS News; former chief political correspondent, Slate magazine
Katie Couric (Associate News Editor, 1975-1978): broadcast journalist and managing editor; correspondent for 60 Minutes and reporter for ABC, CBS, and NBC; first solo female anchor of a major network evening news program.
Robert Cullen: former international correspondent for Newsweek and author 
Lane DeGregory (Editor-in-Chief, 1988–89): features writer for St. Petersburg Times, Pulitzer Prize winner
Marty Kady (News Editor, 1993): editor, Politico Pro 
Meredith Kopit Levien (Associate Opinion Editor, 1991-93): chief executive officer, The New York Times 
George P. Rodrigue III (Editor-in-Chief, 1977–78): former editor-in-chief of The Plain Dealer, two-time Pulitzer Prize winner
Sheryl Gay Stolberg (Executive Editor, 1982–83): Washington correspondent, The New York Times
Jia Tolentino (Opinion Columnist, 2007): staff writer, The New Yorker; author
Michael Vitez (Editor-in-Chief, 1978–79): journalist with The Philadelphia Inquirer, Pulitzer Prize winner

Other areas

Alfred Berkeley, III, former president, NASDAQ stock exchange
Robert W. Daniel, Jr., former U.S. congressman from Virginia, 1973–1983
William Stamps Farish III, former U.S. ambassador to the UK, 2001–2004
 John T. Casteen III, president, University of Virginia, 1990–2010

References

External links
The Cavalier Daily official site
The Cavalier Daily Alumni Association

University of Virginia
The Cavalier Daily
Mass media in Charlottesville, Virginia
Albemarle County, Virginia
Student newspapers published in Virginia
Newspapers established in 1890
1890 establishments in Virginia